Gerald Norman Pencer (April 26, 1945 – February 3, 1998) was a Canadian philanthropist and business executive at the soft drink manufacturing company, Cott (now Primo Water Corporation). Pencer was born in Montreal, Quebec into a Jewish family. When Pencer was 44, he took over Cott, at the time an unknown soft drink manufacturer. Sales increased during Pencer's tenure.

On May 23, 1997, Pencer was diagnosed with a grade 4 glioblastoma multiforme. He and his wife Nancy formed The Gerry & Nancy Pencer Brain Trust. Gerry Pencer died in Toronto, Ontario, Canada at the age of 52. He was buried in the Holy Blossom Section of the Pardes Shalom Cemetery in Toronto, Ontario.

See also 
 List of notable brain tumor patients

References

External links 
  University Health Network: Pencer Brain Tumor Centre
  The Gerry & Nancy Pencer Brain Trust
  Chealth.ca

1945 births
1998 deaths
Anglophone Quebec people
Businesspeople from Montreal
Deaths from brain tumor
Deaths from cancer in Ontario
Jewish Canadian philanthropists
20th-century philanthropists